The British Pteridological Society is for fern enthusiasts of the British Isles, and was founded in England in 1891.

The origins and early history of the BPS at the time of "Pteridomania" is described in the book The Victorian Fern Craze.
The BPS celebrated its centenary in 1991; amongst other things, it was marked by the publication of the book, A World of Ferns.

The British Pteridological Society is a registered charity: No. 1092399. The BPS has as its Patron the Prince of Wales.

Publications
The British Pteridological Society publishes a number of works, which promote pteridology:
 The Fern Gazette
 The Pteridologist
 The Bulletin

Presidents of the Society
John A. Wilson (1831-1914) was elected Chairman of the Society at the first meeting in 1891; subsequently Dr. F.W. Stansfield was invited to become the first President of the Society. He took office in 1892.

References

External links
 Web site of the British Pteridological Society
 BPS Fern Forum

Botanical societies
British biology societies
Ferns
1891 establishments in the United Kingdom
Scientific organizations established in 1891
Horticultural organisations based in the United Kingdom
Scientific organisations based in the United Kingdom